Sulfinylamines (formerly N-sulfinyl amines) are organosulfur compounds with the formula RNSO where R = an organic substituent.  These compounds are, formally speaking, derivatives of HN=S=O, i.e. analogues of sulfur dioxide and of sulfur diimide.  A common example is N-sulfinylaniline.  Sulfinyl amines are dienophile.  They undergo [2+2] cycloaddition to ketenes.

According to X-ray crystallography, sulfinylamines have planar C-N=S=O cores with syn geometry.

Preparation
Sulfinylamines can be made when thionyl chloride SOCl2 reacts with a primary amine.

Reactions
Mixtures of phosphine and borane derivatives can attach to the NSO chain to yield a R'3P=N+(R)SOB−R"3 compound. This can happen with tris(tert-butyl) phosphine and tris-(pentafluorophenyl)borane.

Compounds

References

Nitrogen compounds
Sulfur(IV) compounds